Kate Dickie (born 1971) is a Scottish actress who has appeared in television series, stage plays and films. She is known for her television roles as Lex in the BBC series Tinsel Town (2000–2001) and Lysa Arryn in the HBO series Game of Thrones (2011, 2014). 

Dickie is also known for her portrayal of the security operative Jackie in her 2006 feature-film debut Red Road, directed by Andrea Arnold, for which she won several awards, including Best Actress at the British Academy Scotland Awards and the British Independent Film Award for Best Actress. She again won Best Actress at the 2016 British Academy Scotland Awards for the film Couple in a Hole. Her other film appearances include Prometheus (2012), Filth (2013), The Witch (2015), and Star Wars: The Last Jedi (2017).

She supports the theatre company Solar Bear, which is known for its collaborations with deaf people, in part through her role as a patron.

Early life 
Dickie was born in East Kilbride, Scotland. She spent part of her childhood in different parts of Scotland, Wigtownshire, Galloway, Perthshire and Ayrshire, due to frequent moves by her family. From an early age she discovered her passion for acting, which her parents supported. Coming from a working-class family (her father was a farmer and gardener) in which no family member had been in the arts before, she was embarrassed to call herself an actress since she was afraid to be called pretentious. 

Her desire for drama classes supported her to overcome her insecurities that appeared through the frequent school changes and helped her dealing with adjusting to new people and surroundings. After leaving school she went to college in Kirkcaldy to study for a national certificate in drama. In 1990, she won a place at the Royal Scottish Academy of Music and Drama and decided to stay in Glasgow.

Career 
Dickie started to work in theatre. She achieved her breakthrough in 2000, in the BBC Scotland / Raindog series Tinsel Town.

Through Dickie's performance in her film debut Red Road with her former drama school mate and co-star Tony Curran, she gained more recognition as a serious actress.

In the stage play Aalst, based on the true story of a couple who had killed their children and were sentenced in a high-profile trial, Dickie plays one of the parents. Her motivation to perform this role was her feeling of "responsibility to play people like that and to give them a voice. People that are not necessarily good or nice and have good lives."

She reprised the role of Jackie in Donkeys, a follow-up to Red Road which is directed by Morag McKinnon. She portrayed Mary in the United Kingdom supernatural thriller film Outcast. Dickie was a swimming trainer in the 2010 television film Dive. She appears in the HBO television series Game of Thrones, where she plays the role of Lysa Arryn. In 2018, Dickie appeared in a season 5 episode of Shetland. In 2020, she appeared with Emma Stansfield in the music video for Sleaford Mods' previously unreleased song "Second".

Filmography

Stage

Television

Film

Video game

Awards and nominations

Notes

References

External links

1971 births
Scottish film actresses
Scottish stage actresses
Scottish television actresses
Living people
People from East Kilbride
Actresses from Glasgow
20th-century Scottish actresses
21st-century Scottish actresses